Ro Haber is a transgender writer and director of commercial, music, and documentary films based in Los Angeles, California. They attended NYU's Tisch School of the Arts.
In 2013, they were selected for the Outfest 2013 Screenwriters Lab for their feature screenplay Soledad.
In 2014 their short Jellyfish won Outfest's Grand Jury Prize. Their works have gained popularity and recognition for their work exploring LGBTQ life in a number of different styles and formats. These works include films like Relapse (2015), We've Been Around (2016), Ink (2016), as well as documentary works like New Deep South (2017), Stonewall Forever (2019) and PRIDE: Ep 106, Y2GAY (2021) .

They have also been recognized for their work and have subsequently been granted funding from a number of different fellowship programs for emerging filmmakers. Among these are fellowships in Sundance's New Frontier Lab (2017) as well as the Sundance Momentum Fellowship (2018), Film Independent's Episodic Lab, Outfest's Screenwriting lab, and also the American Film Institute's Directing workshop for women that was created to expose emerging filmmakers to a larger studio audience.

Popularity of New Deep South 
New Deep South, a film series directed by Haber and Lauren Cioffi, has grown in popularity since debuting in 2015. The series aims to showcase the lives of the LGBTQ community in the southern United States by following real members of the community and detailing their experiences. The three-piece series has been nominated for multiple awards and individual episodes have also received recognition. Episode 2, "Kayla", was awarded a Webby Award in 2017 for Best Documentary: Individual Episode.

Additional work 
Their recent projects include Braddock, PA, a documentary that takes a look at the lives of those in working-class Middle America. This piece focuses on the industry life of those working in small towns and explores the relationship between the people and the environmental impact of their towns. As of 2018, they are working on developing a television show aimed at young adults. Chingonas will feature elements of horror and is being developed in Film Independent's Episodic Lab.

Awards 
In addition to the fellowships they have been granted, Ro Haber has been presented with a number of awards at both the national and international level.

Filmography

See also
 List of transgender film and television directors

Notes

References

External links
 

Year of birth missing (living people)
Living people
American women film directors
American women screenwriters
Tisch School of the Arts alumni
Writers from Los Angeles
Screenwriters from California